Kofi Ansah (6 July 1951 – 3 May 2014) was a Ghanaian fashion designer. He was considered a pioneer in promoting modern African styles and design on the international stage. He was married to Nicola Ansah and the father of actor Joey Ansah, Ryan Ansah and Tanoa Sasraku-Ansah.

Early life and education
Ansah was born in 1951 into an artistic family and his interest in art and design was encouraged by his father, a photographer and classical musician. 

Ansah studied at Chelsea School of Art, graduating in 1979 with a first-class honours degree in fashion design and distinction in design technology. 

He initially made his name working on the UK fashion scene as he made headlines on his graduation when he made a beaded top for Princess Anne. In 1992 he returned to Ghana, where he set up and ran the successful design and creative concept company Artdress. 

He was the founder and past president of the Federation of African Designers. Characteristic of his style was the use of quilting, embroidery and appliqué.

He died at Korle-Bu Teaching Hospital, aged 62, on 3 May 2014. His funeral was held in the forecourt of State House in Accra.

Awards and recognitions
Ansah won the prestigious Ghana Quality Awards Diamond Division in October 2003, for clothing and textile with Artdress Ltd, and his company was the winner of the Millennium 2000 African Fashion Awards. 

He also designed the anniversary fabric for the Ghana@50 Golden Jubilee Celebration. He designed the costumes for the opening and closing ceremonies of the 2008 African Cup of Nations staged in Ghana, and in 2009 was the chief designer at the Festival of African Fashion and Arts (FAFA).

He was posthumously honoured in November 2015 at the ETV Ghana Fashion Awards for his "immense contribution to the fashion industry and the prestige of the nation."

References

External links
 Elizabeth Ohene, "Kofi Ansah: Ghana mourns fashion guru", BBC News Africa, 30 May 2014.
 "Changing the Face of Ghanaian Fashion", Business in Africa Pays.

1951 births
2014 deaths
Ghanaian fashion designers
African fashion
Alumni of Chelsea College of Arts